María Esther García (born 22 September 1954) is a Cuban foil fencer. She competed at the 1972 and 1980 Summer Olympics.

References

1954 births
Living people
Cuban female foil fencers
Olympic fencers of Cuba
Fencers at the 1972 Summer Olympics
Fencers at the 1980 Summer Olympics
Pan American Games medalists in fencing
Pan American Games gold medalists for Cuba
Pan American Games silver medalists for Cuba
Fencers at the 1971 Pan American Games
Fencers at the 1975 Pan American Games
Fencers at the 1979 Pan American Games
Fencers at the 1983 Pan American Games
20th-century Cuban women
20th-century Cuban people
21st-century Cuban women